Purple Ocean was a bulletin board system founded in June 1984. The Purple Ocean BBS was best known for its numerous gaming features including numerous different versions and scenarios of Trade Wars 1000, 2000, and 2002. At the high point of its visibility, over 100 different Trade Wars universes were operated simultaneously with thousands of players logging on each day.  The Purple Ocean BBS was also the first BBS in Texas to offer 38.4 kbit/s transfer rates for every node.

Bulletin board systems
Computing stubs